The Cadbury chocolate factory is a five story building located in Gladstone Avenue, Toronto. It was constructed by William Neilson in 1906 and produces all of Cadbury's products sold in Canada.

Location and building 
The five story factory is located at 277 Gladstone Avenue, in the Little Portugal neighbourhood of Toronto.

History and ownership 
The factory was constructed and opened in 1906 by William Neilson of William Neilson Limited. It was purchased in 1996 by Cadbury. As of 2014, it was owned by Cadbuy's parent company Mondelez International.

Ed Pizale was the factory manager in 2010, Dave Heaven managed the factory in October 2014.

The factory received a $37 million renovation in 2019.

Activities 
The cooking processes in the factory are all completely automated. The factory manufactures 500 million chocolate bars per year, producing every Cadbury product sold in Canada. Products made include Crunchie, Wunderbar, Mr. Big, Caramilk, Mini Eggs, Dairy Milk, Cream Egg, and Crispy Crunch.

In 2010, the factory employed 400 staff.

See also
 Cadbury's Chocolate Factory, Tasmania
 Cadbury Ireland
 Cadbury World

References 

1906 establishments in Ontario
Chocolate factories
Manufacturing buildings and structures